The following elections occurred in the year 1828.

North America

United States
 1828 New York gubernatorial election
 1828 United States House of Representatives elections
 1828 United States presidential election
 1828 United States Senate elections

See also
 :Category:1828 elections

1828
Elections